The Humber  is a large tidal estuary on the east coast of Northern England. It is formed at Trent Falls, Faxfleet, by the confluence of the tidal rivers Ouse and Trent. From there to the North Sea, it forms part of the boundary between the East Riding of Yorkshire on the north bank and North Lincolnshire on the south bank. Although the Humber is an estuary from the point at which it is formed, many maps show it as the River Humber.

Below Trent Falls, the Humber passes the junction with the Market Weighton Canal on the north shore, the confluence of the River Ancholme on the south shore; between North Ferriby and South Ferriby and under the Humber Bridge; between Barton-upon-Humber on the south bank and Kingston upon Hull on the north bank (where the River Hull joins), then meets the North Sea between Cleethorpes on the Lincolnshire side and the long and thin headland of Spurn Head to the north.

Ports on the Humber include the Port of Hull, the Port of Grimsby and the Port of Immingham; there are lesser ports at New Holland and North Killingholme Haven. The estuary is navigable for the largest of deep-sea vessels. Inland connections for smaller craft are extensive but handle only a quarter of the goods traffic handled in the Thames.

History
Although it is now an estuary, the Humber had a much longer freshwater course during the Ice Age, extending across what was the dry bed of the North Sea.

The Humber features regularly in medieval British literature. In the Welsh Triads, the Humber is one of the three principal rivers of Britain (together with the Thames and the River Severn) and is continually mentioned throughout the Brut y Brenhinedd as a boundary between the southern kingdom (Lloegyr) and various northern kingdoms. In Geoffrey of Monmouth's 12th-century chronicle, the Humber is named for "Humber the Hun", an invader who drowned there during battle in the earliest days of the chronicle.

The Humber remained an important boundary throughout the Anglo-Saxon period, separating Northumbria from the southern kingdoms. The name Northumbria derives from the Anglo-Saxon  (plural) = "the people north of the Humber".

The Humber is recorded with the abbreviation Fl. Abi (The Abus river) in Ptolemy's Geographia, discharging into the German Ocean (the North Sea) south of Ocelum Promontorium (Spurn Head). Ptolemy also gives the Iron Age tribes of the area as the Coritani south of the Humber and the Parisi to the north.

In the 1719 novel Robinson Crusoe, the eponymous protagonist leaves England on a ship departing from The Humber.

On 23 August 1921, the British airship R38 crashed into the estuary near Hull, killing 44 of the 49 crew on board.

From 1974 to 1996, the areas now known as the East Riding of Yorkshire, North Lincolnshire and North East Lincolnshire constituted the county of  Humberside. The Humber, from 1996, forms a boundary between the East Riding of Yorkshire (to the north) and North Lincolnshire and North East Lincolnshire, to the south.

Crossings
The estuary's only modern crossing is the Humber Bridge, which was the longest single-span suspension bridge in the world from its construction in 1981 until 1998. It is now the eleventh longest.

Before the bridge was built, a series of paddle steamers operated from the Corporation Pier railway station at the Victoria Pier in Hull to the railway pier in New Holland. Steam ferries started in 1841, and in 1848 were purchased by the Manchester, Sheffield and Lincolnshire Railway. They, and their successors, ran the ferry until the bridge opened in 1981. Railway passenger and car traffic continued to use the pier until the end of ferry operations.

The line of the bridge is similar to an ancient ferry route from Hessle to Barton upon Humber, which is noted in the Domesday Book and in a charter of 1281. The ferry was recorded as still operating in 1856, into the railway era.

Defences
The Humber Forts were built in the mouth of the river for the First World War. Planned in 1914, their construction started in 1915 and they were not completed until 1919. A coastal battery at Easington, Fort Goodwin or Kilnsea Battery, faced the Bull Sands Fort. They were also garrisoned during the Second World War, and were finally abandoned for military use in 1956.

Fort Paull is further upstream, a Napoleonic-era emplacement replaced in the early 20th century by Stallingborough Battery opposite Sunk Island.

Crossing on foot
Graham Boanas, a Hull man, is believed to be the first man to succeed in wading across the Humber since ancient Roman times. The feat, in August 2005, was attempted to raise cash and awareness for the medical research charity, DebRA. He started his trek on the north bank at Brough; four hours later, he emerged on the south bank at Whitton. He replicated this achievement on the television programme Top Gear (Series 10 Episode 6) when he beat James May who drove an Alfa Romeo 159 around the inland part of the estuary in a race without using the Humber Bridge.

Crossing by swimming
On Saturday 26 August 1911, Alice Maud Boyall became the first woman to swim the Humber. Boyall, then aged 19 and living in Hull, was the Yorkshire swimming champion. She crossed the Humber from Hull to New Holland Pier swimming the distance in 50 minutes, 6 minutes slower than the existing men's record.

Since 2011, Warners Health have organised the 'Warners Health Humber Charity Business Swim'. Since then, an organised group crossing at the Humber Bridge has become an annual event, with a small number of pre-selected swimmers crossing in a 'pod' which remains close together, in aid of Humber Rescue.

Royal holds the record for the fastest one-way swim across the Humber (35 minutes 11 seconds) and the fastest two-way swim (1 hour, 13 minutes, 46 seconds), certified by Guinness World Records and the World Open Water Swimming Association. He raised over £900 for Humber Rescue, who provided safety support during the swim.

Etymologies
Most European hydronyms are Celtic in origin and numerous Celtic or Pre-Celtic derivations for Humber have been suggested.

The name Humber may be a Brittonic formation containing -[a]mb-ṛ, a variant of the element *amb meaning "moisture", with the prefix *hu- meaning "good, well" (c.f. Welsh hy-, in Hywel, etc).

The first element may also be *hū-, with connotations of "seethe, boil, soak", of which a variant forms the name of the adjoining River Hull.

This is possibly a Latinisation of the Celtic form  (Welsh for river mouth or estuary) but is erroneously given as a name for both the Humber and The Ouse as one continuous watercourse. Both  and  may record an older Indo-European word for water or river, (as in the 'Five Rivers' of the Punjab). An alternative derivation may be from the Latin verb  meaning "to hide, to conceal". The successive name Humbre/Humbri/Umbri may continue the meaning via the Latin verb  also meaning "to cover with shadows".

Ecology
Many fish live in and also migrate along the Humber when returning from the sea to their spawning grounds in Yorkshire, Lincolnshire and Derbyshire. Salmon, sole, cod, eel, flounder, plaice, sprat, lamprey and sand goby have all been caught within the estuary. The Humber is also a good place for over-wintering birds and is a good breeding ground for bitterns, marsh harriers, little terns and avocets. It forms part of the Severn-Trent flyway, a route used by migratory birds to cross Great Britain.

In 2019 the Yorkshire Wildlife Trust and the University of Hull re-introduced the river oyster into the Humber after a sixty-year absence.

See also
Industry of the South Humber Bank
North Wall, Lincolnshire
 Humber, the name of one of the sea areas of the British Shipping Forecast.
Lagoon Hull

Navigable tributaries and connections
River Hull
River Trent
River Ouse, Yorkshire
River Don, South Yorkshire
Aire and Calder Navigation
River Ancholme
Market Weighton Canal

References

External links

River Humber Ferries—Private web site about the Steam era ferries
www.humber.com—Associated British Ports, Humber group. Includes daily details of major shipping movements
www.humberpacketboats.co.uk—Extensive private web site about history of river trading in Humber and tributaries.

 
 
Estuaries of England
Landforms of the North Sea
Ramsar sites in England
River navigations in the United Kingdom
Rivers of Lincolnshire
Rivers of the East Riding of Yorkshire
Natural regions of England